The 1942–43 Svenska Serien season was the eighth season of the Svenska Serien, the top level ice hockey league in Sweden. The series was never completed due to harsh weather conditions.  Hammarby had however already clinched first place in the league for the fifth straight season.

Final standings

External links
1942-43 season 

Svenska Serien (ice hockey) seasons
1942–43 in Swedish ice hockey leagues